Senador Rui Palmeira is a municipality located in the western of the Brazilian state of Alagoas. Its population was 13,921 (2020) and its area is 360 km².

References

Municipalities in Alagoas